Orbivestus karaguensis is a plant in the family Asteraceae, native to Africa.

Description
Orbivestus karaguensis grows as a perennial herb or subshrub. The capitula feature purplish flowers. The fruits are achenes.

Distribution and habitat
Orbivestus karaguensis is native to an area of Africa from Sudan south to Mozambique and west to Angola and Nigeria.

References

External links
Orbivestus karaguensis – Flora of Zambia

Vernonieae
Flora of Africa
Plants described in 1873